A car ramp is a structure or device used to raise an automobile from the ground in order to access its undercarriage. An alternative method to using a jack or jack stands, car ramps are simple to use and relatively inexpensive. Car ramps also offer safety for mechanics by providing vehicle stability during car maintenance and repairs. Some ramp types can be built at home and hand-made with simple tools.

Vehicle Service Ramp Patent 
In January of 1996 the patent for the official design of a vehicle service ramp was granted to two engineers, William W. Fogarty and Phillip M. Friday. This patent was the final rendition of many design patents and has now become the standard of how vehicle service ramps are designed and produced. Previous designs were constructed out of wood and featured an internal crossmember support system, but these versions were found to be too heavy for at home use and maintenance and needed to be able to support more weight to be in compliance with safety regulations. This patent utilizes an injection molding process to create vehicle service ramps out of high density polyethylene. The design features a honeycomb pattern along the internal sidings of the ramp to provide structural support. Before the release of this patent, vehicle service ramps made of plastic or other polymers were susceptible to ‘creep’, which is a form of deformation specific to these materials. The Vehicle service ramp patent of 1996 has standardized the design and production of car ramps used around the world.

Buyers Guide 
There are many different car and vehicle service ramps available today, and it is important to utilize one with the proper features and specifications for the job you are doing. Some important things to pay attention to when selecting a car ramp for personal use and at home maintenance are the weight limits/specifications, ground clearance, and general dimensions. When performing any at home maintenance on an automobile, safety is the first priority. If you plan on performing maintenance to a larger SUV or truck it may be worth considering to purchase car ramps made out stainless steel. While not all stainless steel options will have higher weight limits, they will generally provide a more stable platform to preform maintenance. Regardless, you should always research the weight of your vehicle(s) to determine what strength ramp is required. Ground clearance, or how high up the ramp elevates a car, should also be considered. Smaller cars or sedans ride closer to the ground then larger vehicles and may require to be lifted higher for specific maintenance. On the contrary, if you are working in a vertically confined space it is important not to lift the car too high. Finally, you should ensure that the size of the ramps are suitable for the tire size of your vehicle. This is an important aspect to using car ramps as they are directed to ensure that the measured safety regulations are in place.

See also 
 Auto mechanic
 Automobile repair shop
 Car elevator
 Engine tuning
 Mechanical engineering
 Service (motor vehicle)

References 

Automotive tools
Tools